Volleyball events were contested at the 1963 Summer Universiade in Porto Alegre, Brazil.

References
 Universiade volleyball medalists on HickokSports

U
1963 Summer Universiade
Volleyball at the Summer Universiade